Sha Hai'Ang (in Chinese : 沙海昂) (23 September 1872 – 17 August 1930), was a Franco-Chinese engineer from École Centrale des Arts et Manufactures (now Centrale-Supélec) whose French name was Antoine Joseph Henri Charignon. A railway constructor but also a sinologist and historian, he is particularly known for his work on Marco Polo. He was a member of the Société Asiatique and the Société de géographie of Paris.

Following his life in China and his accession to Chinese nationality, A. J. H. Charignon adopted the Chinese pronunciation of his name, Sha Hai'Ang, which literally means "sand sea".

See also 
 Kunming–Hai Phong Railway

References

External links 
  Les trois vies de Joseph Charignon 
 Le Livre de Marco Polo ... Traduit en français moderne et annoté d'après les sources chinoises par A.J.H. Charignon on WorldCat

1872 births
People from Drôme
1930 deaths
École Centrale Paris alumni
French railway civil engineers
Chinese engineers
French sinologists
Members of the Société Asiatique
Chevaliers of the Légion d'honneur
Recipients of the Croix de Guerre 1914–1918 (France)